A sniper is a military/paramilitary marksman who engages targets from positions of concealment or at distances exceeding the target's detection capabilities. Snipers generally have specialized training and are equipped with high-precision rifles and high-magnification optics, and often also serve as scouts/observers feeding tactical information back to their units or command headquarters.

In addition to long-range and high-grade marksmanship, military snipers are trained in a variety of special operation techniques: detection, stalking, target range estimation methods, camouflage, tracking, bushcraft, field craft, infiltration, special reconnaissance and observation, surveillance and target acquisition. Snipers need to have complete control of their bodies and senses in order to be effective. They also need to have the skill set to use data from their scope and monitors to adjust their aim to hit targets that are extremely far away. In training, snipers are given charts that they’re drilled on to ensure they can make last-minute calculations when they are in the field.

Etymology
The name "sniper" comes from the verb "to snipe", which originated in the 1770s among soldiers in British India in reference to shooting snipes, a wader that was considered an extremely challenging game bird for hunters due to its alertness, camouflaging color and erratic flight behavior. Snipe hunters therefore needed to be stealthy in addition to being good trackers and marksmen. In the 18th century, letters sent home by English officers in India referred to a day's rough shooting as "going sniping", as it took a skilled flintlock sportsman a lot of patience and endurance to wing-shoot a snipe in flight. Accomplishing such a shot was regarded as exceptional, and inevitably during the late 18th century, the term "snipe shooting" was simplified to "sniping". This evolved to the agent noun "sniper", first appearing by the 1820s. The term "sniper" was first attested militarily in 1824, becoming common place in the First World War.

The older term "sharpshooter" comes from the calque of German word Scharfschütze, in use by British newspapers as early as 1801. The word alludes to good marksmanship, itself descendent of the shooting competitions (Schützenfeste) that took place throughout the year in Munich in the 15th century. Small companies of shooters (Schützenfähnlein) from the German states and Swiss cantons would form teams of Scharfschützen for such popular competitions; proudly carrying flags depicting a crossbow on one side and a target musket on the other. The earliest known date for the creation of a shooting club formed specifically for the use of firearms comes from Lucerne, Switzerland, where one club has a charter dating from 1466. During the American Civil War, Confederate marksmen equipped with the imported Whitworth rifles were known as the Whitworth Sharpshooters.

Snipers are also called "hunters" in many languages, due to the nature of the craft (with the hunting horn also being a symbol of marksmanship), being called Caçadores, Chasseurs and Jägers. Other words for sniper include franc-tiréur, tiréur d'élite and atirador de escol.

Modern warfare

Military doctrine
Different countries use different military doctrines regarding snipers in military units, settings, and tactics.

Generally, a sniper's primary function in modern warfare is to provide detailed surveillance from a concealed position and, if necessary, to reduce the enemy's combat ability by neutralizing high-value targets (especially officers and other key personnel) and in the process pinning down and demoralizing the enemy. Typical sniper missions include managing intelligence information they gather during reconnaissance, target acquisition and impact feedback for air strikes and artillery, assisting employed combat force with accurate fire support and counter-sniper tactics, killing enemy commanders, selecting targets of opportunity, and even destruction of military equipment, which tend to require use of anti-materiel rifles in the larger calibers such as the .50 BMG, like the Barrett M82, McMillan Tac-50, and Denel NTW-20.

Soviet- and Russian-derived military doctrines include squad-level snipers. Snipers have increasingly been demonstrated as useful by US and UK forces in the recent Iraq campaign in a fire support role to cover the movement of infantry, especially in urban areas.

Military snipers from the US, UK and other countries that adopt their military doctrine are typically deployed in two-man sniper teams consisting of a shooter and a spotter. A common practice is for a shooter and a spotter to take turns to avoid eye fatigue. In most recent combat operations occurring in large densely populated towns, such as Fallujah, Iraq, two teams would be deployed together to increase their security and effectiveness in an urban environment. A sniper team would be armed with a long-range weapon and a rapid-firing shorter-ranged weapon in case of close quarter combat.

The German doctrine of largely independent snipers and emphasis on concealment, developed during the Second World War, has been most influential on modern sniper tactics, and is currently used throughout Western militaries (examples are specialized camouflage clothing, concealment in terrain and emphasis on coup d'œil).

Sniper teams

Sniper rifles are classified as crew-served in the United States military. A sniper team (or sniper cell) consists of a combination of at least one primary weapon operator, (ie: the shooter), with other support personnel and force protection elements, such as a spotter or a flanker. Within the Table of Organization and Equipment for both the United States Army and Marine Corps, the shooter does not operate alone, but has a backup shooter trained to fulfill multiple roles in addition to being sniper-qualified in the operation of the main weapon.

The shooter focuses mainly on firing the shot, while the spotter assists in observation of targets, accounts for atmospheric conditions and handles ancillary tasks as immediate security of their location, communication with other parties (e.g. directing artillery fire and close air support). A flanker is an extra teammate who is tasked to act as a sentry observing areas not immediately visible to the sniper and spotter, assisting with the team's rear security and perimeter defense, and therefore are usually armed with a faster-firing weapon such as an assault rifle, battle rifle or designated marksman rifle. Both the spotter and flanker carry additional ammunition and associated equipment.

The spotter is responsible for detecting, identifying and assigning priority of targets for the shooter, as well as assessing the outcome of the shot. Using a spotting scope and/or a rangefinder, the spotter will predict the external ballistics and read the wind speed using an anemometer or physical indicators like the mirage caused by ground heat. Also, in conjunction with the shooter, the spotter will calculate the distance, shooting angle (slant range), mil-related correction, interference by atmospheric factors and the required leads for moving targets. It is not unusual for the spotter to be equipped with a ballistic table, a notebook or a tablet computer specifically for performing these calculations.

Law enforcement applications

Law enforcement snipers, commonly called police snipers, and military snipers differ in many ways, including their areas of operation and tactics. A police sharpshooter is part of a police operation and usually takes part in relatively short missions. Police forces typically deploy such sharpshooters in hostage scenarios. This differs from a military sniper, who operates as part of a larger army, engaged in warfare. Sometimes as part of a SWAT team, police snipers are deployed alongside negotiators and an assault team trained for close quarters combat. As policemen, they are trained to shoot only as a last resort, when there is a direct threat to life; the police sharpshooter has a well-known rule: "Be prepared to take a life to save a life." Both types of snipers do make difficult shots under pressure, and often perform one-shot kills.

Police units that are unequipped for tactical operations may rely on a specialized SWAT team, which may have a dedicated sniper. Some police sniper operations begin with military assistance. Police snipers placed in vantage points, such as high buildings, can provide security for events. In one high-profile incident commonly referred to as "The Shot Seen Around the World" due to going viral online, Mike Plumb, a SWAT sniper in Columbus, Ohio, prevented a suicide by shooting a revolver out of the individual's hand, leaving him unharmed.

The need for specialized training for police sharpshooters was made apparent in 1972 during the Munich massacre when the German police could not deploy specialized personnel or equipment during the standoff at the airport in the closing phase of the crisis, and consequently all of the Israeli hostages were killed. While the German army did have snipers in 1972, the use of army snipers in the scenario was impossible due to the German constitution's explicit prohibition of the use of the military in domestic matters. This lack of trained snipers who could be used in civilian roles was later addressed with the founding of the specialized police counter-terrorist unit GSG 9.

Longest recorded sniper kill

The previous record holder was Craig Harrison, a Corporal of Horse (CoH) in the Blues and Royals RHG/D of the British Army.
The QTU Lapua external ballistics software, using continuous doppler drag coefficient (Cd) data provided by Lapua, predicts that such shots traveling  would likely have struck their targets after nearly 6.0 seconds of flight time, having lost 93% of their kinetic energy, retaining  of their original  velocity, and having dropped  or 2.8° from the original bore line.

Harrison mentions in reports that the environmental conditions were perfect for long range shooting, "... no wind, mild weather, clear visibility." In a BBC interview, Harrison reported it took about nine shots for him and his spotter to initially range the target successfully.

Military history
Before the development of rifling, firearms were smoothbore and inaccurate over long distance. Barrel rifling was invented at the end of the fifteenth century, but was only employed in large cannons. Over time, rifling, along with other gunnery advances, has increased the performance of modern firearms.

1701–1800
Early forms of sniping or marksmanship were used during the American Revolutionary War. For instance in 1777 at the Battles of Saratoga, the colonists hid in the trees and used early model rifles to shoot British officers. Most notably, Timothy Murphy shot and killed General Simon Fraser of Balnain on 7 October 1777 at a distance of about 400 yards. During the Battle of Brandywine, Capt. Patrick Ferguson had a tall, distinguished American officer in his rifle's iron sights. Ferguson did not take the shot, as the officer had his back to Ferguson; only later did Ferguson learn that George Washington had been on the battlefield that day.

A special unit of marksmen was established during the Napoleonic Wars in the British Army. While most troops at that time used inaccurate smoothbore muskets, the British "Green Jackets" (named for their distinctive green uniforms) used the famous Baker rifle. Through the combination of a leather wad and tight grooves on the inside of the barrel (rifling), this weapon was far more accurate, though slower to load. These Riflemen were the elite of the British Army, and served at the forefront of any engagement, most often in skirmish formation, scouting out and delaying the enemy.

1801–1900
The term, "sharp shooter" was in use in British newspapers as early as 1801. In the Edinburgh Advertiser, 23 June 1801, can be found the following quote in a piece about the North British Militia; "This Regiment has several Field Pieces, and two companies of Sharp Shooters, which are very necessary in the modern Stile of War". The term appears even earlier, around 1781, in Continental Europe, translated from the German Scharfschütze.
Scouts in the Ashanti army were made up of professional hunters who used their skill as marksmen to snipe at advancing enemy forces in response to detection by the enemy. They executed this often from a perch high in trees.
The Whitworth rifle was arguably the first long-range sniper rifle in the world. A muzzleloader designed by Sir Joseph Whitworth, a prominent British engineer, it used polygonal rifling instead, which meant that the projectile did not have to bite into grooves as was done with conventional rifling. The Whitworth rifle was far more accurate than the Pattern 1853 Enfield, which had shown some weaknesses during the recent Crimean War. At trials in 1857 which tested the accuracy and range of both weapons, Whitworth's design outperformed the Enfield at a rate of about three to one. The Whitworth rifle was capable of hitting the target at a range of 2,000 yards, whereas the Enfield could only manage it at 1,400 yards.

During the Crimean War, the first optical sights were designed to fit onto rifles. Much of this pioneering work was the brainchild of Colonel D. Davidson, using optical sights produced by Chance Brothers of Birmingham. This allowed a marksman to observe and target objects more accurately at a greater distance than ever before. The telescopic sight, or scope, was originally fixed and could not be adjusted, which therefore limited its range.

Despite its success at the trials, the rifle was not adopted by the British Army. However, the Whitworth Rifle Company was able to sell the weapon to the French army, and also to the Confederacy during the American Civil War, where both the Union and Confederate armies employed sharpshooters. The most notable incident was during the Battle of Spotsylvania Court House, where on 9 May 1864, Union General John Sedgwick was killed by a Confederate Whitworth sharpshooter at a range of about  after saying the enemy "couldn't hit an elephant at this distance".

Second Boer War
 
During the Boer War the latest breech-loading rifled guns with magazines and smokeless powder were used by both sides. The British were equipped with the Lee–Metford rifle, while the Boers had received the latest Mauser rifles from Germany. In the open terrain of South Africa the marksmen were a crucial component to the outcome of the battle.

The first British sniper unit began life as the Lovat Scouts, a Scottish Highland regiment formed in 1899, that earned high praise during the Second Boer War (1899–1902). The unit was formed by Lord Lovat and reported to an American, Major Frederick Russell Burnham, the British Army Chief of Scouts under Lord Roberts. Burnham fittingly described these scouts as "half wolf and half jackrabbit.". Just like their Boer scout opponents, these scouts were well practised in the arts of marksmanship, field craft, map reading, observation, and military tactics. They were skilled woodsmen and practitioners of discretion: "He who shoots and runs away, lives to shoot another day." They were also the first known military unit to wear a ghillie suit. 
Hesketh Hesketh-Prichard said of them that "keener men never lived", and that "Burnham was the greatest scout of our time." Burnham distinguished himself in wars in South Africa, Rhodesia, and in Arizona fighting the Apaches, and his definitive work, Scouting on Two Continents, provides a dramatic and enlightening picture of what a sniper was at the time and how he operated.

After the war, this regiment went on to formally become the first official sniper unit, then better known as sharpshooters.

World War I

During World War I, snipers appeared as deadly sharpshooters in the trenches. At the start of the war, only Imperial Germany had troops that were issued scoped sniper rifles. Although sharpshooters existed on all sides, the Germans specially equipped some of their soldiers with scoped rifles that could pick off enemy soldiers showing their heads out of their trench. At first the French and British believed such hits to be coincidental hits, until the German scoped rifles were discovered. During World War I, the German army received a reputation for the deadliness and efficiency of its snipers, partly because of the high-quality lenses that German industry could manufacture.

During the First World War, the static movement of trench warfare and a need for protection from snipers created a requirement for loopholes both for discharging firearms and for observation. Often a steel plate was used with a "key hole", which had a rotating piece to cover the loophole when not in use.
 	

Soon the British army began to train their own snipers in specialized sniper schools. Major Hesketh Hesketh-Prichard was given formal permission to begin sniper training in 1915, and founded the First Army School of Sniping, Observation, and Scouting at Linghem in France in 1916. Starting with a first class of only six, in time he was able to lecture to large numbers of soldiers from different Allied nations, proudly proclaiming in a letter that his school was turning out snipers at three times the rate of any such other school in the world.

He also devised a metal-armoured double loophole that would protect the sniper observer from enemy fire. The front loophole was fixed, but the rear was housed in a metal shutter sliding in grooves. Only when the two loopholes were lined up—a one-to-twenty chance—could an enemy shoot between them. Another innovation was the use of a dummy head to find the location of an enemy sniper. The papier-mâché figures were painted to resemble soldiers to draw sniper fire. Some were equipped with rubber surgical tubing so the dummy could "smoke" a cigarette and thus appear realistic. Holes punched in the dummy by enemy sniper bullets then could be used for triangulation purposes to determine the position of the enemy sniper, who could then be attacked with artillery fire. He developed many of the modern techniques in sniping, including the use of spotting scopes and working in pairs, and using Kim's Game to train observational skills.

In 1920, he wrote his account of his war time activities in his book Sniping in France, to which reference is still made by modern authors regarding the subject.

The main sniper rifles used during the First World War were the German Mauser Gewehr 98; the British Pattern 1914 Enfield and Lee–Enfield SMLE Mk III, the Canadian Ross rifle, the American M1903 Springfield, the Italian M1891 Carcano, and the Russian M1891 Mosin–Nagant.

World War II

During the interbellum, most nations dropped their specialized sniper units, notably the Germans. Effectiveness and dangers of snipers once again came to the fore during the Spanish Civil War. The only nation that had specially trained sniper units during the 1930s was the Soviet Union. Soviet snipers were trained in their skills as marksmen, in using the terrain to hide themselves from the enemy and the ability to work alongside regular forces. This made the Soviet sniper training focus more on "normal" combat situations than those of other nations.

Snipers reappeared as important factors on the battlefield from the first campaign of World War II. During Germany's 1940 campaigns, lone, well-hidden French and British snipers were able to halt the German advance for a considerable amount of time. For example, during the pursuit to Dunkirk, British snipers were able to significantly delay the German infantry's advance. This prompted the British once again to increase training of specialized sniper units. Apart from marksmanship, British snipers were trained to blend in with the environment, often by using special camouflage clothing for concealment. However, because the British Army offered sniper training exclusively to officers and non-commissioned officers, the resulting small number of trained snipers in combat units considerably reduced their overall effectiveness.

During the Winter War, Finnish snipers took a heavy toll of the invading Red Army. Simo Häyhä is credited with 505 confirmed kills, most with the Finnish version of the iron-sighted bolt-action Mosin–Nagant.

One of the best known battles involving snipers, and the battle that made the Germans reinstate their specialized sniper training, was the Battle of Stalingrad. Their defensive position inside a city filled with rubble meant that Soviet snipers were able to inflict significant casualties on the Wehrmacht troops. Because of the nature of fighting in city rubble, snipers were very hard to spot and seriously dented the morale of the German attackers. The best known of these snipers was probably Vasily Zaytsev, featured in the novel War of the Rats and the subsequent film Enemy at the Gates.

German Scharfschützen were prepared before the war, equipped with Karabiner 98 and later Gewehr 43 rifles, but there were often not enough of these weapons available, and as such some were armed with captured scoped Mosin–Nagant 1891/30, SVT, Czech Mauser rifles or scoped Gewehr 98 from WW1. The Wehrmacht re-established its sniper training in 1942, drastically increasing the number of snipers per unit with the creation of an additional 31 sniper training companies by 1944. German snipers were at the time the only snipers in the world issued with purpose-manufactured sniping ammunition, known as the 'effect-firing' sS round. The 'effect-firing' sS round featured an extra carefully measured propellant charge and seated a heavy 12.8 gram (198 gr) full-metal-jacketed boat-tail projectile of match-grade build quality, lacking usual features such as a seating ring to improve the already high ballistic coefficient of .584 (G1) further. For aiming optics German snipers used the Zeiss Zielvier 4x (ZF39) telescopic sight which had bullet drop compensation in 50 m increments for ranges from 100 m up to 800 m or in some variations from 100 m up to 1000 m or 1200 m. There were ZF42, Zielfernrohr 43 (ZF 4), Zeiss Zielsechs 6x, Zeiss Zielacht 8x and other telescopic sights by various manufacturers like the Ajack 4x, Hensoldt Dialytan 4x and Kahles Heliavier 4x with similar features employed on German sniper rifles. Several different mountings produced by various manufacturers were used for mounting aiming optics to the rifles. In February 1945 the Zielgerät 1229 active infrared aiming device was issued for night sniping with the StG 44 assault rifle.

A total of 428,335 individuals received Red Army sniper training, including Soviet and non-Soviet partisans, with 9,534 receiving the sniping 'higher qualification'. During World War ІІ, two six-month training courses for women alone trained nearly 55,000 snipers, of which more than two thousand later served in the army. On average there was at least one sniper in an infantry platoon and one in every reconnaissance platoon, including in tank and even artillery units. Some used the PTRD anti-tank rifle with an adapted scope as an early example of an anti-materiel rifle.

In the United States Armed Forces, sniper training was only very elementary and was mainly concerned with being able to hit targets over long distances. Snipers were required to be able to hit a body over 400 meters away, and a head over 200 meters away. There was almost no instruction in blending into the environment. Sniper training varied from place to place, resulting in wide variation in the qualities of snipers. The main reason the US did not extend sniper training beyond long-range shooting was the limited deployment of US soldiers until the Normandy Invasion. During the campaigns in North Africa and Italy, most fighting occurred in arid and mountainous regions where the potential for concealment was limited, in contrast to Western and Central Europe.

The U.S. Army's lack of familiarity with sniping tactics proved disastrous in Normandy and the campaign in Western Europe where they encountered well trained German snipers. In Normandy, German snipers remained hidden in the dense vegetation and were able to encircle American units, firing at them from all sides. The American and British forces were surprised by how near the German snipers could approach in safety and attack them, as well as by their ability to hit targets at up to 1,000m. A notable mistake made by inexperienced American soldiers was to lie down and wait when targeted by German snipers, allowing the snipers to pick them off one after another. German snipers often infiltrated Allied lines and sometimes when the front-lines moved, they continued to fight from their sniping positions, refusing to surrender until their rations and munitions were exhausted.

Those tactics were also a consequence of changes in German enlistment. After several years of war and heavy losses on the Eastern Front, the German army was forced to rely more heavily on enlisting teenage soldiers. Due to lack of training in more complex group tactics, and thanks to rifle training provided by the Hitlerjugend, those soldiers were often used as autonomous left-behind snipers. While an experienced sniper would take a few lethal shots and retreat to a safer position, those young boys, due both to a disregard for their own safety and to lack of tactical experience would frequently remain in a concealed position and fight until they ran out of ammunition or were killed or wounded. While this tactic generally ended in the demise of the sniper, giving rise to the nickname "Suicide Boys" that was given to those soldiers, this irrational behavior proved quite disruptive to the Allied forces' progress. After World War II, many elements of German sniper training and doctrine were copied by other countries.

In the Pacific War, the Empire of Japan trained snipers. In the jungles of Asia and the Pacific Islands, snipers posed a serious threat to U.S., British, and Commonwealth troops. Japanese snipers were specially trained to use the environment to conceal themselves. Japanese snipers used foliage on their uniforms and dug well-concealed hide-outs that were often connected with small trenches. There was no need for long range accuracy because most combat in the jungle took place within a few hundred meters. Japanese snipers were known for their patience and ability to remain hidden for long periods. They almost never left their carefully camouflaged hiding spots. This meant that whenever a sniper was in the area, the location of the sniper could be determined after the sniper had fired a few shots. The Allies used their own snipers in the Pacific, notably the U.S. Marines, who used M1903 Springfield rifles.

Common sniper rifles used during the Second World War include: the Soviet M1891/30 Mosin–Nagant and, to a lesser extent, the SVT-40; the German Mauser Karabiner 98k and Gewehr 43; the British Lee–Enfield No. 4 and Pattern 1914 Enfield; the Japanese Arisaka 97; the American M1903A4 Springfield and M1C Garand. The Italians trained few snipers and supplied them with a scoped Carcano Model 1891.

Training

Military sniper training aims to teach a high degree of proficiency in camouflage and concealment, stalking, observation and map reading as well as precision marksmanship under various operational conditions. Trainees typically shoot thousands of rounds over a number of weeks, while learning these core skills.

Snipers are trained to squeeze the trigger straight back with the ball of their finger, to avoid jerking the gun sideways. The most accurate position is prone, with a sandbag supporting the stock, and the stock's cheek-piece against the cheek. In the field, a bipod can be used instead. Sometimes a sling is wrapped around the weak arm (or both) to reduce stock movement. Some doctrines train a sniper to breathe deeply before shooting, then hold their lungs empty while they line up and take their shot. Other doctrines assert that exhausting the lungs results in an accelerated heart rate and suggest only a partial exhale before firing.  Some go further, teaching their snipers to shoot between heartbeats to minimize barrel motion.

Accuracy

The key to sniping is accuracy, which applies to both the weapon and the shooter. The weapon should be able to consistently place shots within tight tolerances. The sniper in turn must use the weapon to accurately place shots under varying conditions.

A sniper must have the ability to accurately estimate the various factors that influence a bullet's trajectory and point of impact, such as range to the target, wind direction, wind velocity, altitude and elevation of the sniper, and the target and ambient temperature. Mistakes in estimation compound over distance and can decrease lethality or cause a shot to miss completely.

Snipers zero their weapons at a target range or in the field. This is the process of adjusting the scope so that the bullets' points-of-impact are at the point-of-aim (centre of scope or scope's cross-hairs) for a specific distance. A rifle and scope should retain its zero as long as possible under all conditions to reduce the need to re-zero during missions.

A sandbag can serve as a useful platform for shooting a sniper rifle, although any soft surface such as a rucksack will steady a rifle and contribute to consistency. In particular, bipods help when firing from a prone position, and enable the firing position to be sustained for an extended period of time. Many police and military sniper rifles come equipped with an adjustable bipod. Makeshift bipods known as shooting sticks can be constructed from items such as tree branches or ski poles. Some military snipers use three-legged shooting sticks.

Range and accuracy vary depending on the cartridge and specific ammunition types that are used. Typical ranges for common battle field cartridges are as follows:

U.S. military

Servicemen volunteer for the rigorous sniper training and are accepted on the basis of their aptitude, physical ability, marksmanship, patience and mental stability. Military snipers may be further trained as forward air controllers (FACs) to direct air strikes or forward observers (FOs) to direct artillery or mortar fire.

Russian Army
From 2011, the Russian armed forces have run newly developed sniper courses in military district training centres. In place of the Soviet practice of mainly squad sharpshooters, which were often designated during initial training (and of whom only few become snipers per se), these new army snipers are trained intensively for three months (for conscripts) or longer (for contract soldiers). The training program includes theory and practice of countersniper engagements, artillery spotting, and coordination of air support. The first instructors are the graduates of the Solnechnogorsk sniper training centre.

The method of sniper deployment, according to the Ministry of Defence, is likely to be one three-platoon company at the brigade level, with one of the platoons acting independently and the other two supporting the battalions as needed.<ref>Gavrilov, Yuri "Take a bead: Army gets sniper schools" Rossiiskaya gazeta 19 October 2011.</ref>

Targeting, tactics, and techniques

Range finding
The range to the target is measured or estimated as precisely as conditions permit and correct range estimation becomes absolutely critical at long ranges, because a bullet travels with a curved trajectory and the sniper must compensate for this by aiming higher at longer distances. If the exact distance is not known the sniper may compensate incorrectly and the bullet path may be too high or low. This means that if the sniper incorrectly estimated the distance as 700 meters when the target was in fact 800 meters away, the bullet will be 200 millimeters lower than expected by the time it reaches the target.

Laser rangefinders may be used, and range estimation is often the job of both parties in a team. One useful method of range finding without a laser rangefinder is comparing the height of the target (or nearby objects) to their size on the mil dot scope, or taking a known distance and using some sort of measure (utility poles, fence posts) to determine the additional distance.

To determine the range to a target without a laser rangefinder, the sniper may use the mil dot reticle on a scope to accurately find the range. Mil dots are used like a slide rule to measure the height of a target, and if the height is known, the range can be as well. The height of the target (in yards) ×1000, divided by the height of the target (in mils), gives the range in yards. This is only in general, however, as both scope magnification (7×, 40×) and mil dot spacing change. The USMC standard is that 1 mil (that is, 1 milliradian) equals 3.438 MOA (minute of arc, or, equivalently, minute of angle), while the US Army standard is 3.6 MOA, chosen so as to give a diameter of 1 yard at a distance of 1,000 yards (or equivalently, a diameter of 1 meter at a range of 1 kilometer.) Many commercial manufacturers use 3.5, splitting the difference, since it is easier to work with.

It is important to note that angular mil (mil) is only an approximation of a milliradian and different organizations use different approximations.

At longer ranges, bullet drop plays a significant role in targeting. The effect can be estimated from a chart, which may be memorized or taped to the rifle, although some scopes come with Bullet Drop Compensator (BDC) systems that only require the range be dialed in. These are tuned to both a specific class of rifle and specific ammunition. If the same bullet was shot with 168 grain (10.9 g), a 17.1 MOA adjustment would be necessary.

Shooting uphill or downhill is confusing for many because gravity does not act perpendicular to the direction the bullet is traveling. Thus, gravity must be divided into its component vectors. Only the fraction of gravity equal to the cosine of the angle of fire with respect to the horizon affects the rate of fall of the bullet, with the remainder adding or subtracting negligible velocity to the bullet along its trajectory. To find the correct zero, the sniper multiplies the actual distance to the range by this fraction and aims as if the target were that distance away. For example, a sniper who observes a target 500 meters away at a 45-degree angle downhill would multiply the range by the cosine of 45 degrees, which is 0.707. The resulting distance will be 353 meters. This number is equal to the horizontal distance to the target. All other values, such as windage, time-to-target, impact velocity, and energy will be calculated based on the actual range of 500 meters. Recently, a small device known as a cosine indicator has been developed. This device is clamped to the tubular body of the telescopic sight, and gives an indicative readout in numerical form as the rifle is aimed up or down at the target. This is translated into a figure used to compute the horizontal range to the target.

Windage plays a significant role, with the effect increasing with wind speed or the distance of the shot. The slant of visible convections near the ground can be used to estimate crosswinds, and correct the point of aim. All adjustments for range, wind, and elevation can be performed by aiming off the target, called "holding over" or Kentucky windage. Alternatively, the scope can be adjusted so that the point of aim is changed to compensate for these factors, sometimes referred to as "dialing in". The shooter must remember to return the scope to zeroed position. Adjusting the scope allows for more accurate shots, because the cross-hairs can be aligned with the target more accurately, but the sniper must know exactly what differences the changes will have on the point-of-impact at each target range.

For moving targets, the point-of-aim is ahead of the target in the direction of movement. Known as "leading" the target, the amount of "lead" depends on the speed and angle of the target's movement as well as the distance to the target. For this technique, holding over is the preferred method. Anticipating the behavior of the target is necessary to accurately place the shot.

Hide sites and hiding techniques

The term "hide site" refers to a covered and concealed position from which a sniper and his team can conduct surveillance or fire at targets. A good hide conceals and camouflages the sniper effectively, provides cover from enemy fire and allows a wide view of the surrounding area.

The main purpose of ghillie suits and hide sites is to break up the outline of a person with a rifle.

Many snipers use ghillie suits to hide and stay hidden. Ghillie suits vary according to the terrain into which the sniper wishes to blend. For example, in dry grassland the sniper will typically wear a ghillie suit covered in dead grass.

Shot placement
Shot placement, which is where on the body the sniper is aiming, varies with the type of sniper. These shots depend on tissue damage, organ trauma, and blood loss to kill the target. Body shots are used because the chest is a larger target.

In a high-risk or hostage-taking situation where a suspect is imminently threatening to kill a hostage, police snipers may take head shots to ensure an instant kill. The snipers aim for the medulla oblongata to sever the spine from the brain. While this is believed to prevent the target from reflexively firing their weapon, there is evidence that any brain-hit is sufficient.

Target acquisition

Snipers are trained for the detection, identification, and location of a targeted soldier in sufficient detail to permit the effective employment of lethal and non-lethal means. Since most kills in modern warfare are by other crew-served weapons, reconnaissance is one of the most effective uses of snipers. They use their aerobic conditioning, infiltration skills and excellent long-distance observation equipment (optical scopes) and tactics to approach and observe the enemy. In this role, their rules of engagement typically let them shoot at high-value targets of opportunity, such as enemy officers.

The targets may be personnel or high-value materiel (military equipment and weapons) but most often they target the most important enemy personnel such as officers or specialists (e.g. communications operators) so as to cause maximum disruption to enemy operations. Other personnel they might target include those who pose an immediate threat to the sniper, like dog handlers, who are often employed in a search for snipers. A sniper identifies officers by their appearance and behavior such as symbols of rank, talking to radio operators, sitting as a passenger in a car, sitting in a car with a large radio antenna, having military servants, binoculars/map cases or talking and moving position more frequently. If possible, snipers shoot in descending order by rank, or if rank is unavailable, they shoot to disrupt communications.

Some rifles, such as the Denel NTW-20 and Vidhwansak, are designed for a purely anti-materiel (AM) role, e.g. shooting turbine disks of parked aircraft, missile guidance packages, expensive optics, and the bearings, tubes or wave guides of radar sets. A sniper equipped with the correct rifle can target radar dishes, water containers, the engines of vehicles, and any number of other targets. Other rifles, such as the .50 caliber rifles produced by Barrett and McMillan, are not designed exclusively as AM rifles, but are often employed in such a way, providing the range and power needed for AM applications in a lightweight package compared to most traditional AM rifles. Other calibers, such as the .408 Cheyenne Tactical and the .338 Lapua Magnum, are designed to be capable of limited AM application, but are ideally suited as long range anti-personnel rounds.

Relocating
Often in situations with multiple targets, snipers use relocation. After firing a few shots from a certain position, snipers move unseen to another location before the enemy can determine where they are and mount a counter-attack. Snipers will frequently use this tactic to their advantage, creating an atmosphere of chaos and confusion. In other, rarer situations, relocation is used to eliminate the factor of wind.

Sound masking
As sniper rifles are often extremely powerful and consequently loud, it is common for snipers to use a technique known as sound masking. When employed by a highly skilled marksman, this tactic can be used as a substitute for a noise suppressor. Very loud sounds in the environment, such as artillery shells air bursting or claps of thunder, can often mask the sound of the shot. This technique is frequently used in clandestine operations, infiltration tactics, and guerrilla warfare.

Psychological warfare

Due to the surprise nature of sniper fire, high lethality of aimed shots and frustration at the inability to locate and counterattack snipers, sniper tactics have a significant negative effect on morale. Extensive use of sniper tactics can be used to induce constant stress and fear in opposing forces, making them afraid to move about or leave cover. In many ways, the psychological impact imposed by snipers is quite similar to those of landmines, booby-traps, and IEDs (constant threat, high "per event" lethality, inability to strike back).

Historically, captured snipers are often summarily executed. This happened during World War I and World War II; for example the second Biscari Massacre when 36 suspected snipers were lined up and shot on 14 July 1943.

As a result, if a sniper is in imminent danger of capture, he may discard any items (sniper rifle, laser rangefinder, etc.) which might indicate his status as a sniper. The risk of captured snipers being summarily executed is explicitly referred to in Chapter 6 of US Army doctrine document FM 3-060.11 entitled "SNIPER AND COUNTERSNIPER TACTICS, TECHNIQUES, AND PROCEDURES":

The negative reputation and perception of snipers can be traced back to the American Revolution, when American "Marksmen" intentionally targeted British officers, an act considered uncivilized by the British Army at the time (this reputation was cemented during the Battle of Saratoga, when Benedict Arnold allegedly ordered his marksmen to target British General Simon Fraser, an act that won the battle and French support). The British side used specially selected sharpshooters as well, often German mercenaries.

To demoralize enemy troops, snipers can follow predictable patterns. During the 26th of July Movement in the Cuban Revolution, the revolutionaries led by Fidel Castro always killed the foremost man in a group of President Batista's soldiers. Realizing this, none of Batista's men would walk first, as it was suicidal. This effectively decreased the army's willingness to search for rebel bases in the forests and mountains. An alternative approach to this psychological process is to kill the second man in the row, leading to the psychological effect of nobody wanting to follow the "leader".

Counter-sniper tactics

The occurrence of sniper warfare has led to the evolution of many counter-sniper tactics in modern military strategies. These aim to reduce the damage caused by a sniper to an army, which can often be harmful to both combat capabilities and morale.

The risk of damage to a chain of command can be reduced by removing or concealing features that would otherwise indicate an officer's rank. Modern armies tend to avoid saluting officers in the field, and eliminate rank insignia on battle dress uniforms (BDU). Officers can seek maximum cover before revealing themselves as good candidates for elimination through actions such as reading maps or using radios.

Friendly snipers can be used to hunt the enemy sniper. Besides direct observation, defending forces can use other techniques. These include calculating the trajectory of a bullet by triangulation. Traditionally, triangulation of a sniper's position was done manually, though radar-based technology has recently become available. Once located, the defenders can attempt to approach the sniper from cover and overwhelm them. The United States military is funding a project known as RedOwl (Robot Enhanced Detection Outpost With Lasers), which uses laser and acoustic sensors to determine the exact direction from which a sniper round has been fired.

The more rounds fired by a sniper, the greater the chance the target has of locating him. Thus, attempts to draw fire are often made, sometimes by offering a helmet slightly out of concealment, a tactic successfully employed in the Winter War by the Finns known as "Kylmä-Kalle" (Cold Charlie). They used a shop mannequin or other doll dressed as a tempting target, such as an officer. The doll was then presented as if it were a real man sloppily covering himself. Usually, Soviet snipers were unable to resist the temptation of an apparently easy kill. Once the angle where the bullet came from was determined, a large caliber gun, such as a Lahti L-39 "Norsupyssy" ("Elephant rifle") anti-tank rifle was fired at the sniper to kill him.

Other tactics include directing artillery or mortar fire onto suspected sniper positions, the use of smoke screens, placing tripwire-operated munitions, mines, or other booby-traps near suspected sniper positions. Even dummy trip-wires can be placed to hamper sniper movement. If anti-personnel mines are unavailable, it is possible to improvise booby-traps by connecting trip-wires to hand grenades, smoke grenades or flares. Though these may not kill a sniper, they will reveal their location. Booby-trap devices can be placed near likely sniper hides, or along the probable routes to and from positions. Knowledge of sniper field-craft will assist in this task.

The use of canine units had been very successful, especially during the Vietnam War.

Irregular and asymmetric warfare

The use of sniping (in the sense of shooting at relatively long range from a concealed position) to murder came to public attention in a number of sensational U.S. criminal cases, including the Austin sniper incident of 1966 (Charles Whitman), the John F. Kennedy assassination (Lee Harvey Oswald), and the Beltway sniper attacks of late 2002 (Lee Boyd Malvo). However, these incidents usually do not involve the range or skill of military snipers; in all three cases the perpetrators had U.S. military training, but in other specialties. News reports will often (inaccurately) use the term sniper to describe anyone shooting with a rifle at another person.

Sniping has been used in asymmetric warfare situations, for example in the Northern Ireland Troubles, where in 1972, the bloodiest year of the conflict, the majority of the soldiers killed were shot by concealed IRA riflemen. There were some instances in the early 1990s of British soldiers and RUC personnel being shot with .50 caliber Barrett rifles by sniper teams collectively known as the South Armagh sniper.

The sniper is particularly suited to combat environments where one side is at a disadvantage. A careful sniping strategy can use a few individuals and resources to thwart the movement or other progress of a much better equipped or larger force. Sniping enables a few persons to instil terror in a much larger regular force – regardless of the size of the force the snipers are attached to. It is widely accepted that sniping, while effective in specific instances, is much more effective as a broadly deployed psychological attack or as a force-multiplier.

Snipers are less likely to be treated mercifully than non-snipers if captured by the enemy. The rationale for this is that ordinary soldiers shoot at each other at 'equal opportunity' whilst snipers take their time in tracking and killing individual targets in a methodical fashion with a relatively low risk of retaliation.

War in Iraq

In 2003, the U.S.-led multinational coalition composed of primarily U.S. and UK troops occupied Iraq and attempted to establish a new government in the country. However, shortly after the initial invasion, violence against coalition forces and among various sectarian groups led to asymmetric warfare with the Iraqi insurgency and civil war between many Sunni and Shia Iraqis.

Through to November 2005 the Army had attributed 28 of 2,100 U.S. deaths to enemy snipers. In 2006, it was claimed that one insurgent sniper, "Juba", had shot up to 37 American soldiers.

Training materials obtained by U.S. intelligence had among its tips for shooting U.S. troops, "Killing doctors and chaplains is suggested as a means of psychological warfare.", suggesting that those casualties would demoralize entire units.

Arab Spring
Sniper activity was reported during the Arab Spring civil unrest in Libya in 2011, both from anti-governmental and pro-governmental supporters, and in Syria at least from pro-government forces.

Notable military marksmen and snipers

Even before firearms were available, soldiers such as archers were specially trained as elite marksmen.

17th century
 Lord Brooke, who represented the Parliamentarians in the English Civil War, was the first recorded British sniper victim, killed by a Royalist soldier hiding in a bell tower in Lichfield.

18th century
 Timothy Murphy (American Revolutionary War) – killed British General Simon Fraser during the pivotal Battles of Saratoga, hampering the British advance which resulted in their defeat.
 Patrick Ferguson (American Revolutionary War) – developer of the world's first breech-loaded military rifle (which advanced sniping and sharpshooting tactics), fought with his Corps of Riflemen (recruited from the 6th and 14th Foot) at the Battle of Brandywine, where he may have passed up a chance to shoot George Washington.

19th century
 Napoleonic Wars – Use of Marine sharpshooters in the mast tops was common usage in navies of the period, and Admiral Nelson's death at Trafalgar is attributed to the actions of French sharpshooters. The British Army developed the concept of directed fire (as opposed to massive unaimed volleys) and formed Rifle regiments, notably the 95th and the 60th who wore green jackets instead of the usual redcoats. Fighting as Skirmishers, usually in pairs and trusted to choose their own targets, they wrought havoc amongst the French during the Peninsular War.
 British Rifleman Thomas Plunkett (Peninsular War) – shot French General Colbert and one of his aides at a range of between  using a Baker rifle.
 Colonel Hiram Berdan (American Civil War) – commanded 1st and 2nd US Sharpshooters, who were trained and equipped Union marksmen with the .52 caliber Sharps Rifle. It has been claimed that Berdan's units killed more enemies than any other in the Union Army.
 Jack Hinson (American Civil War) recorded 36 "kills" on his custom-made .50 caliber Kentucky long rifle with iron sights.
 During the American Civil War, an unidentified Confederate sniper shot Major General John Sedgwick during the Battle of Spotsylvania Court House probably with a British Whitworth target rifle at the then-incredible distance of minimum . Ben Powell of the 12th South Carolina claimed credit, although his account has been discounted because the general he shot at with a Whitworth rifled musket was mounted, probably Brig Gen. William H. Morris. Union troops from the 6th Vermont claim to have shot an unidentified sharpshooter as they crossed the fields seeking revenge. The shooting of Sedgewick caused administrative delays in the Union's attack and led to Confederate victory. Sedgwick ignored advice to take cover, his last words according to urban legend being, "They couldn't hit an elephant at this dist-", whereupon he was shot. In reality, he was shot a few minutes later.
 Major Frederick Russell Burnham – assassinated Mlimo, the Ndebele religious leader, in his cave in Matobo Hills, Rhodesia, effectively ending the Second Matabele War (1896). Burnham started as a cowboy and Indian tracker in the American Old West, but he left the United States to scout in Africa and went on to command the British Army Scouts in the Second Boer War. For his ability to track, even at night, the Africans dubbed him, He-who-sees-in-the-dark, but in the press he became more widely known as England's American Scout.

20th century

 Billy Sing (World War I) – An Australian sniper with at least 150 confirmed kills during the Gallipoli Campaign; he may have had close to 300 kills in total at Gallipoli, and went on to fight at the Western Front.
 Francis Pegahmagabow (World War I) – Native Canadian sniper credited with 378 kills, and an unknown number of unconfirmed kills. He only took credit for kills when they were verified by an officer.
 Finnish Lance Corporal Simo Häyhä, nicknamed "White Death", was a sniper during the Winter War and is regarded by many as the most effective sniper in the history of warfare, being credited with killing up to 705 (505 sniper kills, and estimated 200 sub-machine gun kills) Soviet soldiers accomplished in fewer than 100 days. Häyhä used a White Guard M/28 "Pystykorva" or "Spitz", variant of the Russian Mosin–Nagant rifle.
 Mikhail Ilyich Surkov has been said to have killed 702 enemy troops, Vladimir Gavrilovich Salbiev with 601 confirmed kills, Vasilij Kvachantiradze with 534 and Ivan Sidorenko with ~500.
 Lieutenant Lyudmila Pavlichenko (World War II) – female Soviet sniper with 309 confirmed kills, making her the most successful female sniper in history.
 Junior Lieutenant Vasily Zaytsev (World War II) – credited with killing about 200 German soldiers during the Battle of Stalingrad, he is portrayed in the film Enemy at the Gates and in the book War of the Rats; both are fictionalized accounts.
 Semyon Nomokonov killed 367 persons, including a general.
 Gefreiter (Private) Matthäus Hetzenauer (World War II) – Austrian sniper who was credited with 345 confirmed kills on the Eastern Front, the most successful in the Wehrmacht.
 Obergefreiter (Private First Class) Josef 'Sepp' Allerberger (World War II) – Austrian sniper credited with 257 confirmed kills on the Eastern Front. (the same situation as has Hetzenauer – German officers seldom confirmed kills).
 Helmut Wirnsberger – German sniper, who has served in 3. Gebirgsjaegerdivision during WW II and credited 64 confirmed kills.
 Chinese Sergeant Tung Chih Yeh claimed to have shot and killed over 100 Imperial Japanese Army (IJA) soldiers using a Chiang Kai-Shek rifle in around Yangtze during the Second Sino-Japanese War.
 Zhang Taofang (Chinese: 张桃芳; Traditional Chinese: 張桃芳; Wade–Giles: Zhang Tao-fang) was a Chinese soldier during the Korean War. He is credited with 214 confirmed kills in 32 days without using a sniper magnifying scope.Pegler pg.265
 Clive Hulme was a New Zealand recipient of the Victoria Cross, the highest and most prestigious award for gallantry in the face of the enemy that can be awarded to British and Commonwealth forces. He is credited with stalking and killing 33 German snipers in the Battle of Crete.
 Ian Robertson served as a sniper with Australia's 3RAR post World War II. He became one of the most effective snipers during the Korean War where in one instance he killed 30 enemies in a single morning.
 Roza Shanina – Soviet sniper during World War II, credited with 59 confirmed kills, including twelve soldiers during the Battle of Vilnius.
 Gunnery Sergeant Carlos Hathcock (Vietnam War) – achieved 93 confirmed kills but believed to have over 200 unconfirmed kills.
 Chuck Mawhinney (Vietnam War) – 103 confirmed and 216 probable kills.
 Adelbert F. Waldron III (Vietnam War) – achieved 109 confirmed kills.
 Master Sgt. Gary Gordon and Sgt. First Class Randy Shughart (Somalia: Operation Gothic Serpent) – were Delta Force snipers who were awarded the Medal of Honor for their fatal attempt to protect the injured crew of a downed helicopter during the Battle of Mogadishu. This action was later dramatized in the film Black Hawk Down.

21st century

These were the longest recorded and confirmed sniper kills to that time.
Perry used a .50 caliber (12.7 mm) McMillan TAC-50 rifle.
 U.S. Navy Chief Chris Kyle of SEAL Team Three, during four deployments to Iraq between 2003 and 2009, had 255 kills, 160 of which are confirmed by the Pentagon, making him the deadliest marksman in US military history. During the Second Battle of Fallujah alone, when U.S. Marines fought running battles in the streets with several thousand insurgents, he killed 40 enemy personnel. For his deadly record as a marksman during his deployment to Ramadi, the insurgents named him 'Al-Shaitan Ramad' – the Devil of Rahmadi – and put a $20,000 bounty on his head. Kyle was honorably discharged in 2009, and on 2 February 2013, was murdered at a shooting range along with another victim in Texas by a Marine veteran suffering from PTSD. Subject of the movie American Sniper.
 U.S. Marine Corps Staff Sergeant Steve Reichert – Killed an Iraqi insurgent and possibly injured two more hiding behind a brick wall with a shot from 1 mile in Lutayfiyah, Iraq on 9 April 2004. Reichert was using a Barrett M82A3 .50BMG rifle loaded with Raufoss Mk 211 multipurpose rounds.
 U.S. Army SGT Christopher Dale Abbott: As part of a U.S. Army Counter IED team (CIEDT) in Iraq in 2007–2008, he recorded 22 confirmed kills with an M24 7.62×51mm NATO rifle for a period of only 7 months before being injured and sent out of theater. He and his team were tasked with seeking out insurgents placing IEDs along frequently used Main Supply Routes and Alternate Supply Routes.
 U.S. Army Staff Sergeant Timothy L. Kellner – regarded as one of the top snipers still active in the U.S. Army, with 78 confirmed kills during the Iraq War and 3 in Haiti.
 Canadian Master Corporal Graham Ragsdale using a 7.62mm C-3 registered 20 confirmed kills over ten days during Operation Anaconda.
 Sri Lankan Army Sniper, Corporal I.R. Premasiri alias "Nero", of the 5th Battalion in the Gajaba Regiment has 180 confirmed Tamil Tigers kills.
 Iraqi insurgent "Juba", a sniper who features in several propaganda videos. Juba has allegedly shot 37 American soldiers, although whether Juba is a real individual is unknown. He may be a constructed composite of a number of insurgent snipers.
 Corporal Ben Roberts-Smith VC MG of the Australian Special Air Service Regiment was awarded the Medal of Gallantry for his actions in 2006 during Operation Perth in the Chora Valley of Oruzgan Province, Afghanistan. In that action, patrol sniper Roberts-Smith prevented an outnumbered patrol from being overrun by anti-coalition militia with sniper fire. Subsequently, in early 2011, he became the second Australian to be awarded the Victoria Cross on Operation Slipper in Afghanistan. During the Shah Wali Kot Offensive in June 2010, having provided sniper over-watch for ground forces from a helicopter with an M14 EBR rifle, Roberts-Smith was placed into a firefight by helicopter and subsequently eliminated machine gun positions.
 U.S. Army Staff Sergeant Justin Morales – As part of the U.S. Army CIST (Counter Insurgent Sniper Team) in Iraq, he recorded 27 confirmed kills with an M24 7.62×51mm NATO rifle. From 2005 to 2006, Morales and his team in Balad, Iraq were tasked with seeking out insurgents placing IEDs along Main Supply Routes and Alternate Supply Routes.
The shot was fired from a high-rise building and the bullet travelled for "under 10 seconds" before hitting the target, an ISIS insurgent.
 Popular Mobilization Forces volunteer Abu Tahsin al-Salhi was a Shia Iraqi veteran sniper with 350 claimed ISIS kills.

See also
 Jäger (infantry)
 List of snipers
 List of sniper rifles
 Longest recorded sniper kills
 Operation Foxley – plan to kill Adolf Hitler using a sniper
 Sniper Alley
 Snipers of the Soviet Union
 South Armagh Sniper (1990–97)
 Special forces
 Sniper equipment

 References 

Further reading

 
 
  - Total pages: 192 
  
  352 pages
 
  
  
  261 pages
  - Total pages: 453 
  - Total pages: 584 
  - Total pages: 704 
  - Total pages: 143 
  - Total pages: 64 
  - Total pages: 445 
  - Total pages: 280 
  - Total pages: 351 
  - Total pages: 192 
 
  - Total pages: 431 
 Walter, John. (2017)  Snipers at war: And equipment and operations, history'' (US Naval Institute Press, 2017)

External links

 Female Soviet snipers of World War II
 Snipers of WWII
 Sniping in France, by Major H. Hesketh-Prichard
 

 
 
Articles containing video clips
Combat occupations
Marksmanship
Sniper warfare